The , commonly known as the Torneo Cuyano or Torneo del Oeste, is a regional rugby union competition in Argentina. The competition started in 2000 and involves 10 clubs from the unions of Cuyo (Mendoza), San Luis and San Juan provinces.

This annual tournament has traditionally been dominated by Mendocino clubs. As in other inter-provincial tournaments, such as the Torneo del Litoral or Torneo del Noroeste, the best placed clubs in the Torneo del Oeste qualify for the Torneo del Interior.

Championships
All the champions are listed below:

Titles

Titles by club

References

External links
Unión de Rugby de Cuyo
Competition results

Rugby union leagues in Argentina